Tony Head is an Australian Paralympic athlete.  He won a  silver medal at the 1992 Barcelona Games in the Men's Javelin THS3 event.

References

External links
 

Year of birth missing (living people)
Living people
Paralympic athletes of Australia
Paralympic silver medalists for Australia
Paralympic medalists in athletics (track and field)
Athletes (track and field) at the 1992 Summer Paralympics
Medalists at the 1992 Summer Paralympics
Australian male javelin throwers
Javelin throwers with limb difference
Paralympic javelin throwers